Sgraffito (plural: sgraffiti) is a technique either of wall decor, produced by applying layers of plaster tinted in contrasting colours to a moistened surface, or in pottery, by applying to an unfired ceramic body two successive layers of contrasting slip or glaze, and then in either case scratching so as to reveal parts of the underlying layer.  The Italian past participle sgraffiato is also used, especially of pottery.

Etymology
The word sgraffito comes from the Italian language and is derived from graffiare ("to scratch"), ultimately from the Greek  (gráphein, "to write"). Related terms include graffito and graffiti.

History
Sgraffito on walls has been used in Europe since classical times. It was popularized in Italy in the 15th and 16th centuries and can be found in African art. In combination with ornamental decoration these techniques formed an alternative to the prevailing painting of walls. The technical procedure is relatively simple, and the procedures are similar to the painting of frescoes.

Sgraffito played a significant role during the Italian Renaissance, with two of Raphael's workshop, Polidoro da Caravaggio and his partner Maturino da Firenze, among the leading specialists, painting palace facades in Rome and other cities. Most of their work has now weathered away. During the 16th century, the technique was brought to Germany by the master builders of the Renaissance and taken up with enthusiasm. As a simple native art, old examples of sgraffito can be found in the wide surroundings of Wetterau and Marburg. In Germany, the technique is most predominant in Bavaria. The use of sgraffito was common in the creation of housing façades for the purposes of advertising. The technique was also used in Thuringia, the Engadin, Austria and Transylvania.

In Catalonia, sgraffito was implemented in the early 20th century by the Noucentista neo-classical architects and became a recurrent technique in façade decoration.

Another use of sgraffito is seen in its simplified painting technique. One coat of paint is left to dry on a canvas or sheet of paper. Another coat of a different color is painted on top of the first layer. The artist then uses a palette knife or oil stick to scratch out a design, leaving behind an image in the color of the first coat of paint. This can also be achieved by using oil pastels for the first layer and black ink for the top layer. Sometimes a first coat of paint is not needed, and the wet coat scraped back reveals the canvas. This cannot be achieved by using the oil pastel method. This technique is often used in art classes to teach the sgraffito technique to novice art students.

In glass making, sgraffito refers to creating imagery with finely powdered black glass on a sheet glass substrate.
Sgraffito is a subtractive technique; light areas are created by scraping away the powdered glass, while dark areas are made by adding piles of powder. The powdered glass is manipulated with a variety of tools. The finished drawing is very vulnerable until the piece is fired in a kiln.

Art Nouveau

Examples of graphic work on facades saw a resurgence circa 1890 through 1915, in the context of the rise of the Arts and Crafts Movement, the Vienna Secession, and particularly the Art Nouveau movement in Belgium and France.

The English artist Heywood Sumner has been identified as this era's pioneer of the technique, for example his work at the 1892 St Mary's Church, Sunbury, Surrey.  Sumner's work is sgraffito per se, scratched plaster, but the term has come to encompass a variety of techniques for producing exterior graphic decoration.

Other examples include:
 Ceramic panels on the Grande Maison de Blanc, Brussels, architect Oscar François, artist Henri Privat-Livemont, 1896–1897
 Princess of Dreams tile tympanum and other work, Hotel Metropol, Moscow, architect William Walcot, artist Mikhail Vrubel, 1899–1907
 Cauchie House, Brussels, architect Paul Cauchie, 1905
 Ceramic Homage to Prague tympanum of the Municipal House in Prague, architect Osvald Polívka, artist Karel Špillar, 1905–1912

Gallery

See also
 List of art techniques
 Scagliola
 Stucco
 Terrazzo
 Venetian plaster
 Scratchboard

References

External links

 Sgraffito Collection of Museum Boijmans Van Beuningen, Rotterdam.
St. Benet's Chaplaincy at Queen Mary, University of London

Murals
Plastering
Types of pottery decoration
Italian words and phrases
Painting techniques